Anserated refers to a condition where extremities of a creature end in the head of an eagle, lion etc.

Usage
 Certain types of crosses, uses as emblems might be anserated.
 Anserated crosses have been found in the excavations of Carthage.
 Anserated crosses have been used in works of fantasy.
 In Goethe's works of fiction, anserated crosses are used on certain keys.
 Anserated crosses along with the Swastika have been known for their symbolism.

References

.

Art history